Edla Hansen was a Danish film editor active from the 1920s through the 1950s. One of the best-known films she edited was 1922's Häxan.

Biography 
Hansen grew up in Copenhagen and began working as a film cutter at Nordisk Film in 1915. She later spent time at A/S Palladium and Valby. She was married to Holger Christian Hansen.

Selected filmography 

 Susanne (1950)
 For frihed og ret (1949)
 Tre år efter (1948)
 Take What You Want (1947)
 Ditte, Child of Man (1946)
 Discretion Wanted (1946)
 Bolette's Bridal Shower (1938)
 Der var engang (1922)
 Häxan (1922)

References

External links 

 

Danish film editors
Women film editors
1893 births
1979 deaths